Direct Line Insurance Group plc is a British insurance company based in the United Kingdom, formed in 2012 by the divestment of The Royal Bank of Scotland Group's (RBS) insurance division, through an initial public offering. The company owns a number of insurance subsidiaries, providing various insurance products, including Direct Line and Churchill, Darwin as well as the roadside assistance and vehicle recovery provider Green Flag.

The group is listed on the London Stock Exchange, and is a constituent of the FTSE 250 Index.

History
The company was originally established in 1985 by Peter Wood and Martin Long, as the insurance division of The Royal Bank of Scotland Group (RBS). It was the first telephone only insurance company in the United Kingdom. In September 2012, the group's then chief executive, Paul Geddes, announced the business was "operating as a standalone insurance company", in advance of a future full divestment from the RBS Group.

The company was the subject of an initial public offering (IPO) in October 2012. RBS sold a 30% share of the business in the IPO, and sold a further 17% in March 2013, reducing its holding in the business to 48.5%. RBS sold a further 20% in September 2013, and sold the remainder of its holding in February 2014.

Direct Line sold its TRACKER Network UK telematics business to the private equity firm Lysanda in February 2014. In September 2014, it was announced that Mapfre would acquire the Italian and German businesses of Direct Line, for a sum of €550 million. In February 2019, Direct Line announced it would be appointing chief financial officer Penny James as the CEO. In January 2023, Jonathan Greenwood become acting chief executive after James agreed with the board to step down after two successive profit warnings and a dividend cancellation.

Operations
The group owns a number of general insurance brands operating within the United Kingdom, including Direct Line, Direct Line for Business, Churchill, Privilege, Darwin, NIG and Green Flag. Direct Line is a company that specialises in selling insurance and other financial services, sold directly to consumers by telephone and the internet.

Subsidiaries

Darwin
Darwin was founded in Peterborough in 2019 and led by Sumit Bahukhandi. The company only sells through price comparison websites, initially Moneysupermarket, and is built in the Amazon Web Services cloud. It uses a different pricing model to other companies in the group, and acts as a test bed for new ideas.

Direct Line for Business
Direct Line for Business was founded in Leeds in September 2007, and as of December 2020 has 811,000 customers. Since 2010, the company has been led by Jasvinder Gakhal, who has been the director since 2014. The company appointed Claire Sadler as marketing director in October 2017.

Direct Line for Business used PricewaterhouseCoopers to improve their product, and in July 2018, the firm launched a new advertising campaign, with Saatchi and Saatchi London.

In the summer of 2019, Direct Line for Business announced that it was cosponsoring the creation of click and mortar pop up shops at ten locations across the United Kingdom, with cosponsors Amazon, Square, and the small business support network Enterprise Nation. The shops offer twenty small online brands the chance to sell their products, meet customers and experience selling on the High Street for the first time.

References

External links

2012 initial public offerings
British companies established in 2012
Companies based in the London Borough of Bromley
Companies listed on the London Stock Exchange
Corporate spin-offs
 
Financial services companies established in 2012
Insurance companies of the United Kingdom
Royal Bank of Scotland